Baptism of Fire is a 1943 American documentary film starring Elisha Cook Jr. It was nominated for an Academy Award for Best Documentary Feature.

Cast
 Elisha Cook Jr. as Bill

References

External links

 
 Baptism of Fire at the National Archives and Records Administration

1943 films
1943 short films
1943 documentary films
1940s short documentary films
American short documentary films
American World War II propaganda films
American black-and-white films
Black-and-white documentary films
Warner Bros. short films
1940s English-language films